Plitvice or Plitvička jezera can refer to:

 Plitvice Lakes National Park, the largest and oldest national park in Croatia
 Plitvička Jezera, a municipality of Lika-Senj County, Croatia

See also
 Plitvica (disambiguation)